Mount Moriah Cemetery is a burial ground in Fairview, Bergen County, New Jersey in the United States, located on the western slopes of the Hudson Palisades, nearby the Fairview Cemetery.

Moriah (Arabic: مروة Marwah) is the name given to a mountain by the Book of Genesis, in which context it is the location of the sacrifice of Isaac.

Notable interments
 Pesach Ackerman (1928–2013), Rabbi of Meseritz Synagogue
 Camilla Frydan (1887–1949), Austrian-born pianist, singer, composer and songwriter
 Robert P. Grover (1916–1942), first Jewish serviceman from Jersey City to die in WWll
 Russell Harding (d. 2008), New York City administrator
 Arthur George Klein (1904–1968), United States Representative (NY)
 Ira Rubin (1930–2013), American professional contract bridge player
 Garry Winogrand (1928–1984), street photographer
 Rosalyn Sussman Yalow (1921-2011), American medical physicist, and co-winner of the 1977 Nobel Prize in Physiology or Medicine

See also
 List of New Jersey cemeteries
 List of cemeteries in Hudson County, New Jersey

References

External links 
 Website mountmoriahcemeterynj.org
 

Cemeteries in Bergen County, New Jersey
Jewish cemeteries in New Jersey
Fairview, Bergen County, New Jersey